Kfar Pines (lit. Pines Village) is a religious moshav in northern Israel. Located to the north-east of Hadera, adjacent to Pardes Hanna-Karkur and Ein Iron, it falls under the jurisdiction of Menashe Regional Council.

History
The village was established in 1933 by Jewish immigrants from eastern Europe, and was named after the author Rabbi Yehiel Michel Pines. It hosts an ulpena, a religious girls high school, named "Ramat Karniel" (Karniel's height). It is the first ulpena in Israel and therefore it is called "Em HaUlpenot" (mother of all ulpenas).

References 

Moshavim
Religious Israeli communities
Populated places established in 1933
1933 establishments in Mandatory Palestine
Populated places in Haifa District